Markook may refer to:
 Markook, Telangana, India
 Markook shrek, a type of flatbread